Young Billy Young is a 1969 Western film in Deluxe Color starring Robert Mitchum and featuring Angie Dickinson, Robert Walker Jr. (in the title role), David Carradine, Jack Kelly (who plays a villain dressed like his character Bart Maverick in the television series Maverick), Deana Martin (in her screen debut) and Paul Fix. The story was based on a novel by Heck Allen titled "Who Rides with Wyatt" (written pseudonymously as Will Henry) and the screenplay was by Burt Kennedy; the film was directed by Kennedy.

Plot
On the trail, Ben Kane, a former Dodge City lawman, comes across Billy Young, who has no horse and was abandoned by partner Jesse Boone soon after the killing of a Mexican general.

Kane lets young Billy accompany him to a town in New Mexico where he has a job waiting for him as deputy sheriff. Kane's real aim is to find the man who murdered his son.

In town, Kane learns from dance-hall girl Lily Beloit that two men who run the town, John Behan and Frank Boone, secretly intend to gun down Kane first chance they get. Frank Boone may be the one Kane is looking for, but Jesse, who is Frank's son, lands in jail first, accused of shooting Doc Cushman.

Kane and Lily become lovers. Billy, meanwhile, springs Jesse from jail, but feels guilty once Lily reveals to him what happened to Kane's son. After he deals with Behan and the older Boone, the deputy turns in his badge, but recommends Billy for the job.

Cast
 Robert Mitchum as Deputy Ben Kane
 Angie Dickinson as Lily Beloit
 Robert Walker Jr. as Billy Young 
 David Carradine as Jesse Boone
 Jack Kelly	as John Behan
 John Anderson as Frank Boone
 Paul Fix as Charlie (stagecoach driver)
 Willis Bouchey as Doc Cushman
 Parley Baer as Bell
 Robert Anderson as Gambler (billed as Bob Anderson)
 Rodolfo Acosta as Mexican officer
 Deana Martin as Evie

Production
Young Billy Young was filmed on location at Old Tucson, Arizona.

Reception
Howard Thompson of The New York Times thought the film seemed like a mediocre television show, however he found Mitchum and Robert Walker Jr. entertaining: "The picture .. contains two casually expert performances by two professionals, namely Mitchum and young Walker, who also share some tangy, amusing dialogue. Even in a walk-through set-up, Mitchum can do laconic wonders with a good wise-crack, such as the devastating one that closes the picture."

Soundtrack

The film score was composed, arranged and conducted by Shelly Manne, and the soundtrack album was released on the United Artists label in 1969. The main title, sung by Robert Mitchum, was also released as a single.

Track listing
All compositions by Shelly Manne, except as indicated
 "Young Billy Young (Main Title)" (Shelly Manne, Ernie Sheldon) - 4:09
 "Mexican Soldiers" - 1:55
 "Kane's Vision" - 2:42
 "Stagecoach Stomp" - 2:18
 "Lily and Kane (Love Theme)" - 3:13
 "The Train (Pup Tent)" - 2:31
 "Jail Surrounded" - 3:55
 "Quicksand" - 3:21
 "Boone Done In" - 2:24
 "Young Billy Young (Reprise)" (Manne, Sheldon) - 2:52

See also
 List of American films of 1969

References

External links 
 
 
 

1969 films
1969 Western (genre) films
1960s English-language films
American Western (genre) films
Films directed by Burt Kennedy
Films set in New Mexico
Films shot in Tucson, Arizona
Films based on works by Henry Wilson Allen
Revisionist Western (genre) films
1960s American films